Pilar is a city in Córdoba, Argentina, in the Río Segundo Department.

Climate

References

Populated places in Córdoba Province, Argentina